Caffeine Dream may refer to:

Caffeine Dream, a 2006 album by Qwel
"Caffeine Dream", a song by Scream from Fumble